Hinduism is the largest religion in the Indian subcontinent, and the third largest religion in the world. Hinduism has been called the "oldest religion" in the world, and many practitioners refer to Hinduism as "the eternal law". Within this faith, there are four major traditions or denominations, namely, Vaishnavism, Shaivism, Shaktism, and Smartism. There also exist a number of minor traditions, such as Ganapatism and Saurism. 

The religion is a diverse system of thought with a wide variety of beliefs, and hence the concept of God, and the number of deities, rests upon the philosophy and the tradition that make up a devotee's adherence. The faith is described by some to be monotheistic, where all deities are believed to be forms of Brahman, the Ultimate Reality, as popularised by the Advaita philosophy. It is also widely regarded to be polytheistic and henotheistic, though this is also considered to be a form of overgeneralisation.

Deities 

The Trimurti are the most prominent deities of contemporary Hinduism. This consists of Brahma, the Creator, Vishnu, the Preserver, and Shiva, the Destroyer. Their feminine counterparts are Saraswati, the wife of Brahma, Lakshmi, the wife of Vishnu, and Parvati (or Durga), the wife of Shiva.

Brahma

Brahma is the god of creation, and the first of the Trimurti. His consort, as well as his shakti (divine energy), is Saraswati, the goddess of learning. He is identified with the Vedic creator god, Prajapati. His abode is at Satyaloka. The deity is said to have been born out of a lotus that grew out of the navel of Vishnu. He was given the four Vedas by Vishnu, and instructed to commence the act of creation. Brahma is not widely revered in contemporary Hinduism, as no major tradition emerged around his worship, as they did for Vishnu and Shiva. Some of the epithets offered to Brahma include:

 Vedanatha
 Chaturmukha
 Prajapati
 Hiranyagarbha
 Vedagarbha 
 Kaushala

Vishnu

Vishnu is the god of preservation, and the second of the Trimurti. He is generally regarded to be the entity who is most often involved in mortal affairs. His consort, as well as his shakti (divine energy), is Lakshmi, the goddess of prosperity. His abode is at Vaikuntha, where he reclines on the divine serpent, Adishesha. He is regarded to have undertaken ten major incarnations upon the earth for the restoration of dharma and cosmic order, for the sake of the devas and human beings. The most prominent of these incarnations are Rama and Krishna. His adherents are called the Vaishnavas, who regard him to be the supreme deity. Some of the epithets and forms of the preserver deity are:
 Vithoba
 Narayana
 Perumal
 Jagannatha
 Hayagriva
 Achyuta
 Madhava
 Venkateshwara
 Guruvayurappan
 Vaikuntha Chaturmurti
 Vaikuntha Kamalaja
 Lakshmi Narayana
 Krishna
 Vishvarupa
 Ranganatha
 Dashavatara
 Madhusudana
 Padmanabha
 Hari
 Upulvan
 Purushottama
 Vasudeva
 Govinda
 Caturvyūha
Keshava

Dashavatara 
The Dashavatara refers to the ten major incarnations of Vishnu:

 Matsya, the fish
 Kurma, the tortoise
 Varaha, the boar
 Narasimha, the man-lion
 Vamana, the dwarf
 Parashurama, the Brahmin warrior
 Rama, the king, and the hero of the epic Ramayana
 Krishna, a central character in the Mahabharata and the Bhagavad Gita
 Buddha, the deluder of the asuras
 Kalki, the vanquisher of adharma, expected to appear at the end of the Kali Yuga

Balarama, the elder brother of Krishna, is sometimes featured as an avatar of Vishnu in the lists of the Puranas, replacing Buddha, though he is also widely considered in other traditions to be a form of Shesha, the serpent of Vishnu.
Other significant forms of Vishnu include Prithu, Mohini, Dhanvantari, Kapila, Yajna, and a third of Dattatreya.

Shiva

Shiva is the god of destruction, and the third of the Trimurti. His consort, as well as his shakti (divine energy), is Parvati, the goddess of power. His abode is upon the mountain Kailasha. He is often represented with two sons, Kartikeya and Ganesha. His mount is the bull called Nandi. He is usually depicted with a third eye, a crescent upon his forehead, the Ganges flowing from his head, and a blue throat occasioned by consuming the kalakuta poison produced at the churning of the ocean. His adherents are called Shaivas, who regard him to be the supreme deity. Some of the epithets of the destroyer deity are:
 Hara
 Rudra
 Virupaksha
 Manjunatha
 Bholenath
Maheshwara

Avatars 
Some of the major avatars and forms associated with Shiva include:

 Veerabhadra 
 Lingam
 Jyotirlinga
 Dakshinamurthy
 Bhairava 
 Pashupati
 Khandoba 
 Durvasa 
 Nataraja 
 Ardhanarishvara 
 Tripurantaka 
 Mahakala 
 Sharabha 
 Ravananugraha 
 Vaidheeswara 
 Lingodbhava
 Somaskanda 
 Bhikshatana 
 Dattatreya 

The Tridevi comprises the consorts of the Trimurti, as well as each of their shakti. They are the primary goddesses in contemporary Hinduism, believed to assist their respective consorts in their acts of creation, preservation, and destruction in the universe.

Saraswati 

Saraswati is the goddess of learning, and also the patroness of music, art, and speech. The goddess is also regarded to be the power that resides within all poetry and writing. She is the consort of the creator deity, Brahma. She is represented as a graceful figure, donning white, and traditionally depicted with the veena (vīṇā), rosary (akṣamālā), water-pot (kamaṇḍalu) and book (pustaka). Her abode is at Satyaloka. Her mount is the white swan.

Saraswati is associated with the following forms:

 Savitri
 Vani
 Brahmani
 Maha Saraswati
 Gayatri
 Vāc
 Para Saraswati
 Shatarupa
 Medha
 Sharada
 Bharati
 Aditi

Lakshmi 

Lakshmi is the goddess of prosperity, associated with material and non-material wealth, fortune, and beauty. She is the consort of the preserver deity, Vishnu. Her origin is a central part of the Samudra Manthana, a significant event in the Puranas. According to the Lakshmi Tantra, the goddess Lakshmi, in her ultimate form of Mahasri, has four arms of a golden complexion, and holds a citron, a club, a shield, and a vessel containing amrita. The goddess is generally also considered to be serene and submissive to her consort. Her abode is at Vaikuntha. Her mount is typically an elephant or owl, though she is also usually seated on a lotus.

Avatars 
Different manifestations of Lakshmi are - 
 Bhumi
 Vedavati 
 Sita
 Radha
 Gopis
 Rukmini
 Ashtabharya
 Junior wives of Krishna
 Revati
 Padmavathi
 Niladevi
 Tulasi
 Rahi
 Andal
 Narasimhi 
 Varahi
 Ashta Lakshmi - Adi Lakshmi, Dhana Lakshmi, Dhanya Lakshmi, Gaja Lakshmi, Santana Lakshmi, Dhairya Lakshmi, Vidya Lakshmi and Vijaya Lakshmi

Parvati 

Parvati is the goddess of power, and is also associated with courage, fertility, and beauty. She is commonly referred to as Uma and Gauri. She is the consort of the destroyer deity, Shiva, and the daughter of Himavana. She is believed to be the reincarnation of Sati, the daughter of Daksha, who perished in the Daksha Yajna. In the Puranas, she performs a penance to marry Shiva, a celibate brahmachari, and the latter consents when he realises her true identity. When depicted alongside her consort, Parvati generally appears with two arms, but when alone, she is depicted having four, eight or ten arms, and is astride on a tiger or lion. She is generally considered to be a benevolent mother goddess, but also slays evil beings in her form of Kali. In goddess-centric traditions, Parvati is considered to be a complete incarnation of Adi Parashakti. Her abode is at Kailasha.

Avatars 
In her fierce aspect of Kali, Parvati undertakes the following manifestations:

 Mahakali
 Bhadrakali
 Sri Kali
 Bhima Kali

Other goddesses

Communities of goddess worship are ancient in India. In the Rigveda, the most prominent goddess is Ushas, the goddess of dawn. The regional goddesses venerated in Hinduism are generally syncretised with Parvati, Lakshmi, or Adi Parashakti. Some of the major goddesses revered in modern Hinduism include:
 Durga, the goddess of strength, the slayer of Durgamasura and Mahishasura
 Kali, the slayer of Raktabija
 Annapurna, the goddess of food and nourishment
 Yogamaya or Vindhyavasini, the embodiment of Vishnu's divine energy
 Shakambhari, a goddess of vegetation
 Meenakshi, patron goddess of Madurai
 Sati, the first consort of Shiva
 Radha, the goddess of love and chief consort of Krishna
 Gayatri, the personification of the Gayatri Mantra
 Ganga, the goddess personification of the Ganges river
 Yami, the personification of the river Yamuna
 Bhramari, the goddess of bees
 Kaushiki, the goddess who emerges from Parvati
 Narmada, the personification of the river Narmada
 Shashthi, also known as Devasena, wife of Kartikeya, the goddess of children and reproduction
 Svaha, the goddess of sacrifices, daughter of Daksha and wife of Agni
 Manasa, a goddess of snakes and fertility
 Mariamman, the goddess of rain
 Mhalsa, a regional form of either Mohini or Parvati
 Renuka, mother of Parashurama
 Shitala, a regional goddess of diseases
 Rahi, a regional form of Radha, consort of Vithoba
 Bhavani, a regional form of Parvati
 Akilandeshwari, a form of Mahadevi
 Devi Kanya Kumari, patron goddess of Kanyakumari
In Shaivism-Shaktism, there exist nine forms of the goddess Durga, the Navadurga:

 Shailaputri
 Brahmacharini
 Chandraghanta
 Kushmanda
 Skandamata
 Katyayani
 Kalaratri
 Mahagauri
 Siddhidhatri

Tantric Hinduism advocates the worship of the ten forms of Mahadevi, the Mahavidyas:

 Kali
 Tara
 Shodashi
 Bhuvaneswari
 Chhinnamasta
 Bhairavi
 Dhumavati
 Bagalamukhi
 Matangi
 Kamalatmika

A group of ten mother goddesses make up the Matrikas:

 Brahmani
 Maheshwari
 Kaumari
 Vaishnavi
 Varahi
 Narasimhi
 Indrani
 Chamunda
 Vinayaki
 Shivaduti

Pantheon 
The Hindu pantheon is composed of deities that have developed their identities through both the scriptures of Hinduism as well as regional traditions that drew their legends from the faith. Some of the most popular deities of the Hindu pantheon include:

 Ganesha, also called Vinayaka and Ganapati, is a son of Shiva and Parvati. He is regarded to be a god of wisdom, and the remover of all obstacles. Several texts advocate his veneration before any other deity in rituals. The Ganapatya sect worships Ganesha as their chief deity.
 Kartikeya, also called Murugan and Subrahmanya, is a son of Shiva and Parvati. He is the commander of the devas, and a major god of war. The Kaumaram sect worships him as their chief deity. 
 Ayyappan, also called Manikanta, is a regional deity, the son of Shiva and Mohini (an incarnation of Vishnu).

 Hanuman, also called Anjaneya and Maruti, is a vanara devotee of Rama. He is revered as the god of celibacy and strength.
 The Navagrahas are the personifications of the nine planets, revered in Vedic astrology and several temples.
 Kamadeva, also called Manmatha, is the god of love, a son of Vishnu.
 Rati is the goddess of love and pleasure, the consort of Kamadeva.
 Garuda is the eagle demigod mount of Vishnu.
 Shesha is the serpent demigod mount of Vishnu.
 Nandi is the bull mount of Shiva.

Rigvedic deities

The Rigveda speaks of Thirty-three gods called the Trayastrinshata ('Three plus thirty'). They consist of the 12 Adityas, the 8 Vasus, the 11 Rudras and the 2 Ashvins:– Dyauṣ "Sky", Pṛthivī "Earth", Vāyu "Wind", Agni "Fire", Nakṣatra "Stars", Varuṇa "Water", Sūrya "Sun", Chandra "Moon". The Twelve Ādityas (personified deities) – Vishnu, Aryaman, Indra (Śakra), Tvāṣṭṛ, Varuṇa, Bhaga, Savitṛ, Vivasvat, Aṃśa, Mitra, Pūṣan, Dhata. Indra also called Śakra, the supreme god, is the first of the 33, followed by Agni. Some of these brother gods were invoked in pairs such as Indra-Agni, Mitra-Varuna and Soma-Rudra.

Adityas 
 Mitra, the god of oaths, promises, and friendships
 Varuna, the god of water the seas, the oceans, and rain
 Indra, also called Śakra, the king of gods, and the god of weather, storms, rain, and war
 Savitr, the god of the morning sun; associated with Surya
 Aṃśa, solar deity; associated with Surya
 Aryaman the god of customs, hospitality, and marriages
 Bhaga, god of fortune
 Vivasvan, the god of the sun
 Tvāṣṭṛ, the god of architecture and smithing; blacksmith of the gods
 Pūshan, patron god of travellers and herdsmen, god of roads,
 Dhāta, god of health and magic, also called Dhūti
 Vamana avatar of Vishnu

Rudras 

The Ramayana tells they are eleven of the 33 children of the sage Kashyapa and his wife Aditi, along with the 12 Adityas, 8 Vasus and 2 Ashvins, constituting the Thirty-three gods. The Vamana Purana describes the Rudras as the sons of Kashyapa and Aditi. The Matsya Purana notes that Surabhi – the mother of all cows and the "cow of plenty" – was the consort of Brahma and their union produced the eleven Rudras. Here they are named: Nirriti, Shambhu, Aparajita, Mrigavyadha, Kapardi, Dahana, Khara, Ahirabradhya, Kapali, Pingala and Senani. Brahma allotted to the Rudras the eleven positions of the heart and the five sensory organs, the five organs of action and the mind.

Vasus
The Vasus serve as the assistants of Indra and of Vishnu.

 Agni the "Fire" god, also called Anala or "living",
 Varuna the "Water" and "Ocean" god, also called Samudradeva or Apa,
 Vāyu the "Wind" and "Air" god, also called Anila ("wind"),
 Dyauṣ the "Sky" god, also called Dyeus and Prabhāsa or the "shining dawn", also called akasha or sky,
 Pṛthivī the "Earth" goddess/god, also called Dharā or "support" and Bhumi or Earth,
 Sūrya the "Sun" god, also called Pratyūsha, ("break of dawn", but often used to mean simply "light"), the Saura sect worships Sūrya as their chief deity, also called Anshuman,
 Soma the "Moon" god, also called Chandra.
 Nakshatrani, also called Dhruva or motionless polestar (Polaris) and Prabhasa.

Ashvins

The Ashvins (also called the Nāsatyas) are the twin gods of medicine. Nasatya is also the name of one twin, while the other is called Dasra.

References

Sources
 : '  The Vedas refer to not 33 crore Devatas but 33 koti (Koti means types in Sanskrit) of Devatas. They are explained in Shatpath Brahman and many other scriptures very clearly. (In Sanskrit 33 koti means 33 types god's ) [...] .' The number 33 comes from the number of Vedic gods explained by Yajnavalkya in Brhadaranyaka Upanishad – the eight Vasus, the eleven Rudras, the twelve Adityas, Indra and Prajapati. (Chapter I, hymn 9, verse 2) . They are: 8-Vasu, 11-Rudra, and 12-Aaditya, 1-Indra and 1-Prajaapati.

 : "Though the popular figure of 330 million is not the result of an actual count but intended to suggest infinity, the Hindu pantheon in fact contains literally hundreds of different deities [...]"
 
 

Deities
Hinduism